The men's 400 metres event at the 2003 European Athletics U23 Championships was held in Bydgoszcz, Poland, at Zawisza Stadion on 17 and 20 July.

Medalists

Results

Final
19 July

Heats
18 July
Qualified: first 2 in each heat and 2 best to the Final

Heat 1

Heat 2

Heat 3

Participation
According to an unofficial count, 24 athletes from 15 countries participated in the event.

 (1)
 (1)
 (1)
 (3)
 (2)
 (2)
 (2)
 (1)
 (1)
 (1)
 (3)
 (2)
 (1)
 (1)
 (2)

References

400 metres
400 metres at the European Athletics U23 Championships